Starl House was a historic home located at St. Georges, New Castle County, Delaware.  It was built before 1822, and was a -story, three bay, brick dwelling with a gable roof and corbelled brick cornice. The house had a side hall plan and was in the Late Federal style.

It was added to the National Register of Historic Places in 1982. It was demolished before 1992.

References

Houses on the National Register of Historic Places in Delaware
Federal architecture in Delaware
Houses in New Castle County, Delaware
National Register of Historic Places in New Castle County, Delaware